The Carillon generating station (in French: centrale de Carillon) is a hydroelectric power station on the Ottawa River near Carillon, Quebec, Canada. Built between 1959 and 1964, it is managed and operated by Hydro-Québec. The dam spans the river between Carillon and Pointe-Fortune, Quebec.

This inundated the rapids of Long-Sault on the Ottawa River, transforming them into calm (deeper) water. The dam also includes a modern lock that facilitates traffic on the Ottawa River, superseding the Carillon Canal.

See also

List of crossings of the Ottawa River
List of hydroelectric stations in Quebec

References

External links
 
Hydro-Québec English Web page

Dams completed in 1964
Energy infrastructure completed in 1964
Dams in Ontario
Dams in Quebec
Hydroelectric power stations in Quebec
Hydro-Québec
Buildings and structures in Laurentides
Buildings and structures in the United Counties of Prescott and Russell
Run-of-the-river power stations